The Civic Alliance of Serbia (abbr. ГСС or GSS) was a liberal political party in Serbia.

History
Known widely by its three-letter acronym in Serbian, GSS was founded and registered in 1992.

In the 1992 election, the party was represented by Ratomir Tanić.

Following the election, the Republican Club led by Nebojša Popov and the Reform Party of Serbia led by Vesna Pešić (Serbian successor to Ante Marković's SFR Yugoslavia-wide Union of Reform Forces party) merged into the party. Both had gone in coalition with the League of Social Democrats of Vojvodina.

In 1996 Žarko Korać left the GSS with a group of dissidents who opposed forming coalition with the right-wing Serbian Renewal Movement for the 1996 federal election and formed the Social Democratic Union (SDU).

Notable members over the years included Goran Svilanović, former Foreign Minister of Serbia and Montenegro, Nataša Mićić, former parliamentary president and acting president of Serbia, Gašo Knezević, former Serbian Minister of Education, and Vesna Pešić, the party founder and longtime leader.

The future of the party had been in doubt ever since it split into two wings. One part promoted a merger with Democratic Party, while the other part wanted to continue political existence as an independent party. The December 2004 party congress upheld the decision to remain an independent party and elected Nataša Mićić as the new leader. The party decided to apply for membership of the ELDR and the Liberal International. At its May 2004 council, ELDR, accepted GSS as an affiliate member.

However, GSS merged into Liberal Democratic Party (LDP) on April 7, 2007. The party had three representatives in the National Assembly of Serbia in 2007 elected from the list of the LDP.

Presidents of the Civic Alliance of Serbia (1992–2007)

Electoral performance

Parliamentary elections

Positions held
Major positions held by Civic Alliance of Serbia members:

References

1992 establishments in Serbia
2007 disestablishments in Serbia
Anti-nationalist parties
Defunct liberal political parties
Defunct political parties in Serbia
Liberal parties in Serbia
Political parties disestablished in 2007
Political parties established in 1992
Pro-European political parties in Serbia
Social liberal parties